Nip/Tuck is an American medical drama television series created by Ryan Murphy that aired on FX in the United States from July 22, 2003, to March 3, 2010. The series, which also incorporates elements of crime drama, black comedy, family drama, satire, and psychological thriller, focuses on "McNamara/Troy", a cutting-edge, controversial plastic surgery center, and follows the personal and professional lives of its founders Dr. Sean McNamara and Dr. Christian Troy (portrayed by Dylan Walsh and Julian McMahon, respectively). Each episode features graphic, partial depictions of the plastic surgeries on one or more patients, as well as developments in the doctors' personal lives. Focus is also given to McNamara/Troy's anesthesiologist Dr. Liz Cruz, Christian's many sexual partners, and Sean's family. With the exception of the pilot, each episode of the series is named after one of the patients scheduled to receive plastic surgery.

Unlike most medical dramas, Nip/Tuck used serial storytelling and often had story arcs spanning multiple seasons; for example, seasons two and three focused on a serial rapist known as The Carver, who often mutilates his victims' faces, leading McNamara/Troy to provide pro bono surgery to the victims.

The show premiered on July 22, 2003, and concluded on March 3, 2010, with the 100th episode.  Despite being initially set in Miami, at the end of the fourth season, it was relocated to Los Angeles, and many of the characters followed along. The show earned 45 award nominations, winning one Golden Globe and one Emmy Award. Series creator Ryan Murphy said that the medical cases on the show are "100 percent based on fact".

Overview
The drama is set in a plastic-surgery center, McNamara/Troy, centering on the two doctors who own it. Sean McNamara (Dylan Walsh) is often found having problems at home due to being seduced by beautiful women on a daily basis, and thus tries to keep his family together by patching up the rocky road in which his family and himself are living. Partner Christian Troy (Julian McMahon), though, uses his charm to bring in potential female candidates and conducts vain business deals, almost never failing and ending up with dozens of women in bed.  Sean takes his job seriously and often must fix Christian's mistakes.

Production
In its debut season, Nip/Tuck was the highest-rated new series on American basic cable, and the highest-rated basic cable series of all time for the 18–49 and 25–54 age demographics. 

The fifth season premiered on October 30, 2007, though production was affected by the 2007 Writers Strike. Accordingly, the second half of the fifth season was not screened until January 6, 2009, in the U.S. Another 19 episodes were picked up by FX; airing on October 14, 2009. Following a three-week hiatus for the Christmas holidays, the show resumed in January 2010, and concluded on March 3, 2010, with its 100th episode. 

Nip/Tuck filmed its 100th and final episode on June 12, 2009, without creator Ryan Murphy, who was, at the time, in India scouting locations for his film version of the memoir Eat, Pray, Love.

The show inspired the creation of the plastic-surgery reality show Dr. 90210.

Characters and cast

Main cast

Recurring cast

Episodes

Main crew
 Michael M. Robin
 Elodie Keene   (10 episodes, 2003–2007)
 Ryan Murphy   (8 episodes, 2003–2006)
 Charles Haid   (8 episodes, 2006–2008)
 Craig Zisk   (6 episodes, 2003–2008)
 Nelson McCormick (4 episodes, 2003–2006)
 Richard Levine   (4 episodes, 2006–2009)
 Jamie Babbit   (3 episodes, 2003–2004)
 Greer Shephard   (3 episodes, 2004–2005)
 Brad Falchuk   (3 episodes, 2007–2009)
 Scott Brazil   (2 episodes, 2003–2004)
 Jeremy Podeswa   (2 episodes, 2005)
 Dirk Craft   (2 episodes, 2008–2009)
 Jennifer Salt   (15 episodes, 2003–2009)
 Sean Jablonski   (13 episodes, 2003–2008)
 Lynnie Greene   (3 episodes, 2006–2009)
 Hank Chilton

Awards and nominations
 Emmy Awards (2010):
 Nominated – Outstanding Prosthetic Makeup for a Series, Miniseries, Movie or a Special
 Emmy Awards (2009):
 Nominated – Outstanding Prosthetic Makeup for a Series, Miniseries, Movie or a Special
 Nominated – Outstanding Makeup for a Series (Nonprosthetic)
 Emmy Awards (2008):
 Nominated – Outstanding Guest Actress in a Drama Series (Sharon Gless)
 Nominated – Outstanding Guest Actor in a Drama Series (Oliver Platt)
 Emmy Awards (2007):
 Nominated – Outstanding Prosthetic Makeup for a Series, Miniseries, Movie or a Special
 Emmy Awards (2006):
 Nominated – Outstanding Art Direction for a Single-Camera Series
 Nominated – Outstanding Prosthetic Makeup for a Series, Miniseries, Movie or a Special
 Nominated – Outstanding Makeup for a Series (Nonprosthetic)
 Golden Globe Awards (2005):
 Won – Best Television Series – Drama
 Nominated – Best Performance by an Actor in a Television Series – Drama (Julian McMahon)
 Nominated – Best Performance by an Actress in a Television Series – Drama (Joely Richardson)
 Emmy Awards (2005):
 Nominated – Outstanding Casting for a Drama Series
 Nominated – Outstanding Guest Actress in a Drama Series (Jill Clayburgh)
 Nominated – Outstanding Prosthetic Makeup for a Series, Miniseries, Movie or a Special
 Nominated – Outstanding Makeup for a Series (Nonprosthetic)
 Golden Globe Awards (2004):
 Nominated – Best Television Series – Drama
 Nominated – Best Performance by an Actress in a Television Series – Drama (Joely Richardson)
 Emmy Awards (2004):
 Won – Outstanding Makeup for a Series, Miniseries, Movie or a Special (Prosthetic)
 Nominated – Outstanding Directing for a Drama Series
 Nominated – Outstanding Main Title Design
 Nominated – Outstanding Main Title Theme Music
 Nominated – Outstanding Makeup for a Series (Nonprosthetic)

U.S. television ratings
Viewer numbers (based on average total viewers per episode) of Nip/Tuck on FX.

Nip/Tuck became an instant cable hit from its 2003 series premiere.

For its third season, FX aired Nip/Tuck solely in the fall of 2005, instead of during the summer season, like the two years prior. John Landgraf, president of FX, stated that such a move was a "huge risk", since it stacked up "against the full barrage of fall network competition". Despite some criticism on its third season, the story arc involving The Carver attracted even more of an audience to the series than any of the seasons before, reaching its climax in a December 20, 2005, two-hour season finale, entitled "Cherry Peck / Quentin Costa", which became the most-watched scripted program in the history of the FX network.

Including "Cherry Peck / Quentin Costa", three episodes of Nip/Tuck rank as the three most-watched scripted programs ever on FX. The second-season finale, entitled "Joan Rivers", which aired on October 5, 2004, drew 5.2 million viewers. It was then eclipsed on September 20, 2005, when the third-season premiere, entitled "Momma Boone", drew roughly 5.3 million viewers. Three months later on December 20, 2005, the aforementioned third-season finale, entitled "Cherry Peck / Quentin Costa", drew 5.7 million viewers. Of those 5.7 million viewers, 3.9 million were in the 18–49 age group demographic, "making the finale the number-one episode among the key advertising demographic of any cable series in 2005. It's also the largest demographic number for any single telecast in the network's history," according to Zap2It.

According to the September 8, 2006, Mediaweek column "The Programming Insider", "the fourth-season premiere on Tuesday, September 5, 2006, averaged 4.8 million total viewers and 3.4 million adults 18–49, building over its season-three average by 25% and 26%, respectively. Nip/Tucks performance among adults 18–49 ranks as basic cable’s top-rated season premiere in the demographic for 2006, as of September 8, 2006."

International broadcasts

In Australia, the series aired on Showcase and Nine Network; in Canada on CTV and Series+; in France on M6; in Ireland on TG4; in New Zealand on TV One and Canterbury Television; and in the United Kingdom on Fox, Sky Living, Sky1 and Channel 4. In the United Kingdom the showed only commenced airing on January 13, 2004. In South Africa the show aired, after the actual running time, on SABC 3.

Home media

International adaptation
In 2013, the Colombian network Caracol TV produced the Spanish language adaptation of the series, titled Mentiras perfectas (Perfect Lies).

References

External links

 
 Nip/Tuck at TV Guide

 
2003 American television series debuts
2010 American television series endings
2000s American medical television series
2010s American medical television series
2000s American workplace drama television series
2010s American workplace drama television series
Best Drama Series Golden Globe winners
English-language television shows
2000s American LGBT-related drama television series
FX Networks original programming
Serial drama television series
Television series by Warner Bros. Television Studios
Television shows set in Miami
Television shows set in Los Angeles
Transgender-related television shows
Television series created by Ryan Murphy (writer)
Television series about plastic surgery
2010s American LGBT-related drama television series